Stephen Wilfred Farmer SC (born 23 May 1950) is a former Barbadian cricketer, and now a Senior Counsel in Barbados.

An all-rounder, Farmer won the man of the match award when Barbados defeated Trinidad and Tobago in the final of the Gillette Cup in 1975-76; he scored 68, the highest score of the match, and took 2 for 38. His father Wilfred played for Barbados in the 1950s.

He was educated at The Lodge School in Barbados and the College of Law in Guildford, England. He is one of the founding partners of the Barbados law firm Clarke Gittens Farmer, and was appointed a Queen's Counsel in 2013.

References

External links
 
 Stephen Farmer at CricketArchive

1950 births
Living people
People educated at The Lodge School, Barbados
Alumni of The University of Law
Barbados cricketers
Barbadian cricketers
Barbadian Queen's Counsel